Impartiality (also called evenhandedness or fair-mindedness) is a principle of justice holding that decisions should be based on objective criteria, rather than on the basis of bias, prejudice, or preferring the benefit to one person over another for improper reasons.

Legal concept
European Union law refers in the Charter of Fundamental Rights of the European Union to:
 A right to good administration:
Every person has the right to have his or her affairs handled impartially, fairly and within a reasonable time by the institutions, bodies, offices and agencies of the Union (Article 41)
 A right to an effective remedy and to a fair trial:
Everyone is entitled to a fair and public hearing within a reasonable time by an independent and impartial tribunal previously established by law (Article 47).

Religious concepts

Buddhism
Impartiality is one of the seven factors conducive to spiritual enlightenment in Buddhism.

Christianity
 "For there is no partiality with God". — Romans 2:11, New World Translation of the Holy Scripture (De10:17, 2Ch19:7, Ac10:34,35)
 "But he that doeth wrong shall receive for the wrong which he hath done: and there is no respect of persons". —Colossians 3:25, KJV
 "My dear brothers and sisters, how can you claim that you have faith in our glorious Lord Jesus Christ if you favor some people more than others? For instance, suppose someone comes into your meeting dressed in fancy clothes and expensive jewelry, and another comes in who is poor and dressed in shabby clothes. If you give special attention and a good seat to the rich person, but you say to the poor one, 'You can stand over there, or else sit on the floor' - well, doesn't this discrimination show that you are guided by wrong motives? Listen to me, dear brothers and sisters. Hasn't God chosen the poor in this world to be rich in faith? Aren't they the ones who will inherit the Kingdom he promised to those who love him? And yet, you insult the poor man! Isn't it the rich who oppress you and drag you into court? Aren't they the ones who slander Jesus Christ, whose noble name you bear? Yes indeed, it is good when you truly obey our Lord's royal command found in the scriptures: 'Love your neighbor as yourself'. But if you pay special attention to the rich, you are committing a sin, for you are guilty of breaking that law". — Epistle of James 2:1-9, NLT
 "But the wisdom that comes from heaven is first of all pure; then peace-loving, considerate, submissive, full of mercy and good fruit, impartial and sincere". – Epistle of James 3:17, NIV

Hinduism
 "Truth, O Bharata, as it exists in all the world, is of thirteen kinds. The forms that Truth assumes are impartiality, self-control, forgiveness, modesty, endurance, goodness, renunciation, contemplation, dignity, fortitude, compassion, and abstention from injury". – Truth, The Mahabharata, Santi Parva, Section CLXII.

Islam
 "O you who have believed, be persistently standing firm in justice, witnesses for Allah, even if it be against yourselves or parents and relatives. Whether one is rich or poor, Allah is more worthy of both. So follow not [personal] inclination, lest you not be just. And if you distort [your testimony] or refuse [to give it], then indeed Allah is ever, with what you do, Acquainted". Quran 4:135.
 "O you who have believed, be persistently standing firm for Allah, witnesses in justice, and do not let the hatred of a people prevent you from being just. Be just; that is nearer to righteousness. And fear Allah ; indeed, Allah is Acquainted with what you do". Quran 5:8.

Judaism
 "You shall do no injustice in court. You shall not be partial to the poor or defer to the great, but in righteousness shall you judge your neighbor". — Leviticus 19:15, English Standard Version
 "You shall not be partial in judgment. You shall hear the small and the great alike". – Deuteronomy 1:17, ESV
 "These things also belong to the wise. It is not good to have respect of persons in judgment". – Book of Proverbs 24:23, KJV

See also 
Neutrality
Objectivity (philosophy)

References

Further reading 
 Gert, Bernard. 1995. "Moral Impartiality". Midwest Studies in Philosophy XX: 102–127.
 Dworkin, Ronald. 1977. Taking Rights Seriously. Harvard University Press.
 Occhiogrosso, Peter. "Buddhism", The Joy of Sects: a spirited guide to the world's religious traditions, 1991 p. 84

External links

Impartiality, from Stanford Online Encyclopedia of Philosophy
openbible.info The Bible on impartiality
quranicteachings.org The Quran on impartiality

Legal ethics
Criminal justice
Virtue